WATN-TV (channel 24) is a television station in Memphis, Tennessee, United States, affiliated with ABC. It is owned by Tegna Inc. alongside CW affiliate WLMT (channel 30). Both stations share studios at the Shelby Oaks Corporate Park on Shelby Oaks Drive in the northeast section of Memphis, while WATN-TV's transmitter is located in the Brunswick section of unincorporated northeast Shelby County.

History

As an independent station, then Fox affiliate
The station first signed on the air on September 10, 1978, as WPTY-TV, and was the first station on the UHF band and first independent station in the market, as well as the first new commercial station to sign on in Memphis since WREG-TV (channel 3) debuted 23 years earlier. Memphis had a longer wait for an independent station than other cities its size. Although Memphis itself had almost 650,000 people at the time channel 24 signed on, the Memphis market has always been a medium-sized market because the surrounding suburban and rural areas aren't much larger than Memphis itself. By contrast, Nashville got an independent as early as 1968 (the present WZTV, now a Fox affiliate). WPTY-TV originally operated from studios located at 2225 Union Avenue in Memphis.

It was owned by Petry Television (the source of its call letters), and ran a general entertainment format featuring cartoons, movies, sitcoms, westerns and drama series. WPTY also carried CBS, NBC and ABC programs whenever WREG-TV, WMC-TV (channel 5) and WHBQ-TV (channel 13) preempted network shows in favor of local programs. By 1983, WPTY gained competition when the TVX Broadcast Group signed on WMKW (channel 30, now WLMT), sparking a rivalry between the two independents. In February 1984, Petry sold the station to Precht Communications for $13 million.

TVX signed a deal to affiliate all of its stations with Fox in 1987, which resulted in WMKW becoming Memphis' Fox affiliate. Precht Communications sold the station to Chase Broadcasting in 1988. On July 1, 1990, Fox pulled its affiliation from channel 30 (by then known as WLMT) and gave it to WPTY. This occurred because WLMT had been sold a few months earlier, and TVX's affiliation agreement with Fox included a clause stating that if an under-performing TVX station was sold, it ran the risk of losing its affiliation. At that time, WPTY began to be carried on a few cable systems in the Mississippi portion of the Columbus–Tupelo–West Point market; this situation continued when WLOV-TV became a Fox affiliate in October 1995 and ultimately ended when WKDH signed on as an ABC affiliate in June 2001.

Chase Broadcasting merged with Renaissance Broadcasting in 1992. Due to Federal Communications Commission (FCC) rules which limited the number of stations a company could own, Renaissance was forced to put WPTY and several other stations up for sale. WPTY was purchased by Clear Channel Communications (now iHeartMedia) later that year. In 1993, Clear Channel entered into a local marketing agreement (LMA) with WLMT's then-owner MT Communications, allowing the once rivals to pool resources and programming.

As an ABC affiliate
In 1995, WPTY was set to be displaced as Memphis' Fox outlet after Fox unexpectedly bought longtime ABC affiliate WHBQ-TV; the purchase was finalized on July 5, 1995. However, News Corporation had to run WHBQ as an ABC affiliate for over five months after the sale was completed. ABC ultimately chose to affiliate with WPTY; the two stations switched affiliations on December 1, 1995.

The station gradually took on the look of a traditional network affiliate, carrying mostly first-run syndicated shows and a few sitcom reruns while WLMT ran cartoons, movies, sitcoms and some reality/talk shows. In 1999, WPTY picked up a secondary affiliation with The WB, airing the network's schedule in late nights. This was because Memphis, despite its relatively large size, didn't have enough stations for a separate WB affiliate. Previously, WB programming appeared on the superstation feed of Chicago's WGN-TV, as well as a special feed created by Time Warner Communications, TV Memphis. The changes took effect on October 4. In 2001, Clear Channel bought WLMT outright from Max Media, creating the first television duopoly in the Memphis market. Clear Channel moved WB programming to WLMT in 2003.

Newport Television and Nexstar ownership 

On April 20, 2007, Clear Channel entered into an agreement to sell its entire television station group to Newport Television, a company controlled by private equity firm Providence Equity Partners. Newport announced on July 19, 2012, that it would sell 12 of its stations, including WPTY and WLMT, to Nexstar Broadcasting Group. The transaction was finalized on December 3.

On June 1, 2013, WPTY, WLMT and WJKT's operations were moved to a converted former MCI call center on the city's northeast side. Nexstar invested $5 million in constructing the new facilities, which included high definition cameras and other new studio equipment, a new set repurposed from sister station KLRT-TV in Little Rock (which consolidated its news department with KARK-TV earlier that year after Nexstar purchased the station through Mission Broadcasting as a result of the Newport deal), equipment to allow reporters from its new sister station KARK to appear on-air, and a shift away from automation for the production of its newscasts (the station formerly used Ross Overdrive for newscast automation, but continues to use other Ross products in the new facilities). As a result of these changes, WPTY became the final station in the Memphis market to begin broadcasting its local newscasts in high definition. Alongside the new studio and HD transition, WPTY re-launched as "Local 24" and changed its call letters to WATN-TV as part of a campaign coinciding with the move.

Sale to Tegna Inc. 
On December 3, 2018, Nexstar announced it would acquire the assets of Chicago-based Tribune Media—which has owned WREG-TV since December 2013—for $6.4 billion in cash and debt. Nexstar was precluded from acquiring WREG directly or indirectly while owning WATN/WLMT, as FCC regulations prohibit common ownership of more than two stations in the same media market, or two or more of the four highest-rated stations in the market. (Furthermore, any attempt by Nexstar to assume the operations of WREG through local marketing or shared services agreements would have been subject to regulatory hurdles that could have delayed completion of the FCC and Justice Department's review and approval process for the acquisition.) As such, Nexstar decided to sell WATN to a separate, unrelated company to address the ownership conflict. WLMT does not rank among the top four in total-day viewership and therefore is not in conflict with existing FCC in-market ownership rules; however, Nexstar opted to sell that station alongside WATN.

Ultimately, on March 20, 2019, Nexstar announced that it would keep the higher-rated WREG-TV, and sell WATN-TV and WLMT (excluding WJKT) to McLean, Virginia-based Tegna Inc. once its acquisition of Tribune was consummated. This was part of the company's sale of nineteen Nexstar- and Tribune-operated stations to Tegna and the E. W. Scripps Company in separate deals worth $1.32 billion; this would make the duopoly sister stations to NBC affiliate WBIR-TV in Knoxville and CBS affiliate KTHV in Little Rock. The sale was completed on September 19, 2019. (Tegna was spun off from the newspaper-focused Gannett Company, which also owns The Commercial Appeal, which, ironically, was co-owned with WMC-TV from its 1948 sign-on until founding owner Scripps-Howard Broadcasting sold channel 5 to Bert Ellis in 1993.)

A new set for WATN's newscasts was introduced in September 2022; it is based on the set designs used by other Tegna stations, but accented with metal trusses as a nod to the city's bridges.

News operation

WATN-TV presently broadcasts 22 hours of locally produced newscasts each week (with four hours each weekday and one hour each on Saturdays and Sundays). In addition, WATN produces an hour-long nightly 9 p.m. newscast for WLMT.

After becoming an ABC affiliate, Clear Channel decided to invest in a news department for WPTY. When it launched on December 1, 1995, newscasts were initially branded as NewsWatch 24 and featured an energetic, youthful and almost "grunge" look. From the start, in addition to the newscasts on channel 24, the station has also produced a prime time newscast on WLMT, initially titled NewsWatch 30 at 9, in competition with the in-house 9 p.m. newscast that WHBQ debuted when it joined Fox. Several years later, WPTY rebranded as ABC 24 News (with the WLMT newscast being renamed UPN 30 News at 9) and began to modify its style to reach a broader audience.

In 2002, WPTY adopted the Eyewitness News format (which was previously used by WHBQ until 1997), and adopted a harder-edged, more aggressive and often "confrontational" approach to its reporting style. The change resulted in most of its original news anchors and reporters leaving or being laid off, with a complete overhaul in the station's image and presentation. During this time, WPTY's news operation had its share of recognition and awards. It was honored in 2005 with Associated Press broadcasting awards for "Best Breaking News", "Best Newscast", "Best Reporter" and "Best Sportscast". The station was also honored in 2005 with an Edward R. Murrow and regional Emmy Award as the "Best Weekend Newscast".

In 2006, the Associated Press honored WPTY with nine awards including "Best Overall Newscast". However, since its news department began, WPTY's newscasts have lagged in last place in the ratings, placing far behind long-dominating rivals WREG, WMC and WHBQ. In 2009, with continued low ratings, and under its new Newport Television ownership, the station brought in new management, leading to several staff layoffs. Gradually, WPTY's newscasts dropped most of the confrontational and aggressive style. In November 2010, after eight years of operating under the Eyewitness News name, WPTY reverted to the previous ABC 24 News brand. On April 29, 2012, WPTY began broadcasting its newscasts in 16:9 widescreen standard definition.

When the station became WATN on June 1, 2013, it ushered in a complete overhaul of its news programming. With the move to its new Shelby Oaks studio, WATN began broadcasting newscasts in high definition on that date; the newscasts were also rebranded as Local 24 News. On October 7, 2013, WATN debuted a local talk program, Local Memphis Live (replacing Live! with Kelly and Michael, which was dropped in early September) that competed with WHBQ's newscast and WREG's own news/talk program in the 9 a.m. timeslot. The show was briefly known as Memphis This Morning and provided Coronavirus-related information during the 2020 COVID-19 pandemic before being dropped in favor of 25 Words or Less in December 2020.

On September 27, 2021, WATN once again reverted to the ABC 24 News brand, which the station had used twice before. This change drops the Local branding, which is commonly known to be used by Nexstar stations. The relaunch included a new logo and a shuffle of syndicated programs. Notable changes include the move of The Ellen DeGeneres Show from 4 p.m. to 9 a.m. and the addition of The Nick Cannon Show and You Bet Your Life. The 11 a.m. newscast was also reduced from one hour to thirty minutes to make way for Daily Blast Live.

Notable former on-air staff 
 Dayna Devon – weeknight anchor/reporter (1997–1999, now at KTLA)

Technical information

Subchannels
The station's digital signal is multiplexed:

From April 2011 to July 30, 2012, the station carried TheCoolTV on its second digital subchannel, which was available locally on Comcast digital channel 915. After the expiration of Newport's deal to carry the network, the subchannel affiliated with the Live Well Network, which was carried on WPTY-DT2 until mid-March 2013, when it was pulled from the station.

On June 15, 2016, Nexstar announced that it has entered into an affiliation agreement with Katz Broadcasting for the Escape, Laff, Grit, and Bounce TV networks (the last one of which is owned by Bounce Media LLC, whose COO Jonathan Katz is president/CEO of Katz Broadcasting), bringing one or more of the four networks to 81 stations owned and/or operated by Nexstar, including WATN-TV (Bounce TV and Grit are already available in Memphis on digital subchannels of WMC-TV).

Analog-to-digital conversion
WATN-TV (as WPTY-TV) discontinued regular programming on its analog signal, over UHF channel 24, on June 12, 2009, as part of the federally mandated transition from analog to digital television. The station's digital signal remained on its pre-transition UHF channel 25, using PSIP to display WATN-TV's virtual channel as 24 on digital television receivers.

See also
WLMT

References

External links
Official website

ATN-TV
ABC network affiliates
Laff (TV network) affiliates
Cozi TV affiliates
Twist (TV network) affiliates
True Crime Network affiliates
Quest (American TV network) affiliates
Comet (TV network) affiliates
Charge! (TV network) affiliates
Television channels and stations established in 1978
Tegna Inc.
1978 establishments in Tennessee